Victor Junior Morsing (born 16 June 1988), better known by his stage name Victor och Natten  is a Swedish singer.

Life and career
Morsing was born on 16 June 1988 in Köping. His father died when he was very young and he added the name Natten in his artist name as a tribute to him. He released his first music single called "Svartsjuk" in 2014. Morsing writes songs in Swedish and describes his music as "pop music with rap lyrics". He participated in Melodifestivalen 2016, performing the song "100%" in semi-final 2, ending up in sixth place, not progressing to the final.

Discography

Singles

References

Living people
1988 births
Swedish-language singers
Swedish male singers
Swedish pop singers
Swedish rappers
People from Köping
Melodifestivalen contestants of 2016